The Tamiami Canal or C-4 Canal, is a canal located in southern Florida in the United States. It flows in a west to east direction from the western part of the state in the Everglades past the Miami International Airport to a salinity control center near the Miami River.

In 2019, a worm-shaped amphibian caecilian, Typhlonectes natans, was found living in the canal. Normally found in Venezuela and Colombia, its capture was the first record of a caecilian in the United States.

See also
Miami Canal

References

Southeast District Assessment and Monitoring Program - 

Canals in Florida
Transportation buildings and structures in Collier County, Florida
Transportation buildings and structures in Miami-Dade County, Florida